Teri Yakimoto is the third album by the Huntington Beach, California punk rock band Guttermouth, released in 1996 by Nitro Records. It was their first album with bass player Steve Rapp and continued the band's style of fast, abrasive punk rock with tongue-in-cheek humor and sarcastic lyrics. This time, however, the band experimented with more melody and pop influence. By all accounts the recording process was plagued with problems, and at one point most of the recordings were scrapped and re-recorded with a new producer. A music video was filmed for the song “Whiskey” and the album became the band's only to reach the Billboard Heatseakers chart, reaching #33.

Track listing
All songs written by Guttermouth except "Casserole of Life" by Dan Root and Guttermouth, and "Under the Sea"
"Use Your Mind" 1:51
"Trinket Trading, Tick Toting, Toothless, Tired Tramps...or the 7 T's" 2:17
"Generous Portions" 1:43 
"A Day at the Office" 2:25
"Teri Yakimoto" 3:27
"Whiskey" 2:21
"Lock Down" 3:52
"God's Kingdom" 2:29
"Mark's Ark" 1:42
"Room for Improvement" 2:19
"Casserole of Life" 2:53
"Thought Provoking Sonic Device" 2:09
"I Saw the Light" 2:58
"1-2-3-4"* 6:30
"Under the Sea" 1:10

*"1-2-3-4" is a medley of 4 short songs: "Give Me a Gun," "Food for Thought," "Gar-bage (gar'bij), a Perfect Example of Uninteresting Poetry," and "Up Your Bum."

Performers
Mark Adkins - vocals
Scott Sheldon - guitar
Eric "Derek" Davis - guitar
Steve "Stever" Rapp - bass
James Nunn (aka Captain James T. Nunn) - drums

Album information
Record label: Nitro Records
Recorded at Fat Planet Studios by Ryan Greene
Additional recording at Westbeach Recorders by Steve Kravac
Produced by Ryan Greene and Guttermouth
Additional production by Steve Kravac with assistance by Adam Kramer
Mastered by Eddie Schrayer at Futuredisc
Design and layout by Daredevil Studios and C. Martin
Band photo by Paul Cobb

Charts

References

Guttermouth albums
Nitro Records albums
1996 albums
Albums produced by Ryan Greene